Michael Maranga Mawanda (born 23 July 1967) is a Ugandan businessman, economist and politician. He is a serving member of parliament for Igara East Bushenyi District. and the current vice chairperson at Kampala International University Uganda.

Early life and education

Born in Bushenyi District on 23 July 1967. Mawanda attended Masheruka Secondary School for his O-Level Education and St. Francis Secondary School for his A-Level Education, attaining his Uganda Certificate of Education in 1985 and his Uganda Advanced Certificate of Education in 1989.

Mawanda attained his Degree Bachelor of Arts at Makerere University in 1993.

Career and politics

Mawanda's political service started in 2011 as a member of parliament for Igara County East as a National Resistance Movement member for the term 2011–2016.
In 2016 Mawanda contested as an independent and won, becoming a member of the 10th Parliament of Uganda representing Igara County East, Bushenyi District term 2017–2020.

Professional body
Mawanda is a full member in the Oil and Gas Service Providers.

References 

1967 births
Living people
Members of the Parliament of Uganda
National Resistance Movement politicians
21st-century Ugandan politicians